Yankee Rose was a Los Angeles-based rock band in the 1970s and '80s, whose notable members were guitarist Donny Simmons of another popular band Stormer, drummer Abe Perez who recorded with popular blues guitarist Jay Gordon, singer Michael Adams who currently performs as 'Mick Adams' for the Rolling Stones Tribute Band 'Mick Adams and the Stones'.

Personnel 
 Michael "Mick" Adams - vocals
 Donny Simmons - guitar
 John Rockwood - guitar
 Pete Currier - bass
 Abe Perez - drums
 Tom Barringer - drums

Popularity in the Los Angeles Music Scene 
Yankee Rose frequently performed at many of the popular clubs in Los Angeles and Hollywood, sharing the stage many notable acts, such as,  Movies and Aunti-Up at Hong Kong Cafe, Dolphins, Popsicles, Axis and Smile, and Gilbert Gram at the Troubadour, Erin's All Stars, The Blitz Bros, the Penny's, the Rabble, Wynield, and Obryan, at the Starwood, and Bluebeard at the Whisky a Go Go.

Reviews

Yankee Rose (1980 album) 
In 1980, Yankee Rose recorded and released a self-titled album with Goldmine Records. In John M. Borack's, Shake Some Action - The Ultimate Guide To Power Pop, Yankee Rose is #121 on the list. Borack provides a favorable review of the Yankee Rose album, saying, "Another hopelessly obscure 'un, and one that's never made it to CD. Too bad, too, because these guys had the pleading-voiced teen angst thing down pat, especially on the absolutely superb "Any Time of the Day". Kudos to lead vocalist Michael Adams"

See also 
 Music of San Gabriel Valley
 Rolling Stones
 Stormer
 Jay Gordon

References 

Rock music groups from California
Musical groups established in the 1970s
Musical groups from Los Angeles